Leernes [] is a Charleroi Metro station, build at ground level and located in Leernes (part of the Fontaine-l'Évêque municipality), in fare zone 2. The station has only one entrance, on its eastern end.

Nearby points of interest 
The station is located in a rural area, relatively far from the community it is supposed to serve. The Leernes cemetery is 400 m away from the station.

Transfers  
There are no direct bus transfers at the station, although there's a stop of TEC Charleroi bus line 173 which is 300 m away. That line does not run on Sundays.

Charleroi Metro stations
Railway stations opened in 1983